Joseph Maurice Francis Connaughton (15 August 1918 – 12 February 1944) was an English first-class cricketer active 1939 who played for Middlesex. He was born in Paddington. During World War II he was commissioned in the Royal Artillery. He was drowned off the Maldives after SS Khedive Ismail was torpedoed; and officially declared dead one year later.

References

1918 births
1944 deaths
English cricketers
Middlesex cricketers
Oxford University cricketers
Alumni of Brasenose College, Oxford
Royal Artillery officers
British Army personnel killed in World War II
Deaths due to shipwreck at sea
Military personnel from London
People declared dead in absentia